Sharon Solwitz is a fiction writer and professor based in Chicago, Illinois. She is the author of the short story collection Blood and Milk and the novels Bloody Mary and Once, in Lourdes. Tom Perotta and Heidi Pitlor selected her story "Alive" for inclusion in The Best American Short Stories 2012, and her story "Gifted" was chosen for the 2016 collection. She earned a Ph.D. from the University of Illinois at Chicago in 1991, and teaches creative writing at Purdue University.

References

External links 
 The author's faculty page

University of Illinois Chicago alumni
Purdue University faculty
Living people
Year of birth missing (living people)
Women writers (modern period)